The Sauber C31 was a Formula One racing car designed by Sauber for use in the 2012 Formula One season. The car was driven by Kamui Kobayashi and Sergio Pérez. Technical director James Key announced that he was leaving the team just four days before the C31 was due to be launched at Jerez de la Frontera.

The chassis was designed by James Key, Matt Morris, Pierre Waché and Willem Toet with the car being powered with a customer Ferrari engine. 

Unlike previous cars such as the Sauber C29 and to a lesser extent, the C30, the C31 has much more visual sponsorship applied to the car such as Telmex, Telcel, Claro, Chelsea FC, Tequila Cuervo, Visit México, Oerlikon, NEC and Certina. Many of which are Mexican based companies brought from driver Sergio Pérez and reserve driver Esteban Gutiérrez.

Season review

At the  the Chelsea FC logo was added to the car.

For the  the C31 achieved its best points haul of the season with Kobayashi coming in fifth position before a penalty pushed him up into fourth, with Pérez following him home in sixth, giving the team 20 points in one round. This was their best scoring round since returning to Formula One as a privateer team.

At the Belgian GP Kobayashi started second and Pérez fourth (the best grid positions in Sauber's history). At the start of the race, Romain Grosjean caused a spectacular crash taking himself, Pérez, championship leader Fernando Alonso and Lewis Hamilton out of action. Kobayashi's Sauber was also damaged in the incident which knocked him right down the field and he finished the race in 13th place.

The Italian GP turned out to be a great weekend for the Sauber F1 team and they scored 20 points. Pérez scored second place (his third podium of the season), and Kobayashi ninth. Pérez had a strong race, overtaking drivers like Schumacher, Räikkönen, Rosberg, Massa and Alonso. The Sauber team had a great strategy with Pérez's car, starting on hard tyres and changing it to medium compound tyres by lap 30 of 53 (the opposite strategy to those who started at the front of the grid). Kobayashi started in 8th place and finished in 9th, scoring two points.

Conclusion

The Sauber C31 finished the 2012 season in a very respectable sixth place with 126 points (as much as a private team since 1993), two fastest laps (China and Monaco), four podiums (Malaysia, Canada, Italy and Japan) and 13 Q3. The car proved to be fast and very competitive, though inconsistent to find the set-up in some circuits and, above all, at the time of the race qualifications.

Use in testing

The Sauber C31 has been used to test young drivers by the team. Former IndyCar Series driver Simona de Silvestro tested the C31 during her time with the team. She drove the car at the Fiorano Circuit, owned by engine supplier Ferrari and used by them to test. The car has also been used by the team to test young drivers Adderly Fong and Roy Nissany in a two-day test at the Circuit Ricardo Tormo. The car completed 99 laps at the circuit on both days with Fong driving on day one and Nissany driving on day two.

Complete Formula One results
(key) (results in bold indicate pole position; results in italics indicate fastest lap)

 Driver failed to finish, but was classified as they had completed over 90% of the race distance.

References

External links

C31
2012 Formula One season cars